ACE TV was a free-to-air community television channel in Adelaide, South Australia which broadcast from May 1994 to December 2002. ACE TV was cancelled in 2002 due to breaching of licence conditions. The last ACE TV broadcast on-screen was in May 2002. ACE TV was superseded by C31 Adelaide, which was launched on 23 April 2004.

References

External links
Today Tonight report on ACE TV

Television stations in Adelaide
English-language television stations in Australia
Defunct television channels in Australia
Television channels and stations established in 1994
Television channels and stations disestablished in 2002
1994 establishments in Australia
2002 disestablishments in Australia